Bardapur is one of the oldest village in Ambajogai taluka of Beed district of Maharashtra. It has one of the oldest police station and is a religious centre. A very old Shiva (Mahadev) temple is in the center of Village. The weather in Bardapur ranges from 16-28-degree Celsius a year

References

Villages in Beed district